Violin Concerto No. 1 in F-sharp minor, Op. 14, by Polish violin virtuoso Henryk Wieniawski was first performed on October 27, 1853 in Leipzig. The score is dedicated to King Friedrich Wilhelm IV of Prussia.

Structure 
The work is in three movements:

A typical performance takes around 28 - 30 minutes.

Analysis 
The first movement has two contrasting themes, the first in dotted rhythm and initially hesitant and the second in B major (begun by the cellos), wide-ranging and expressive. These are, in turn, dissected and ornamented by the soloist with formidable virtuosity, using multiple-stopping and harmonics and, notably in the cadenza, the extreme upper register of the violin.

The second movement, Preghiera (Prayer), is a short lyrical interlude in A major, with the orchestra woodwinds and horns given much prominence. It leads into the concluding Rondo, a colourful and vivacious piece with a contrasting episode in B major and demanding bravura playing, but without the first movement's extreme pyrotechnics (suggesting that it was composed earlier).

References

External links 
 

Wieniawski 01
Compositions by Henryk Wieniawski
1853 compositions
Compositions in F-sharp minor